John Moulsdale  ( – ) was a Welsh international footballer. He was part of the Wales national football team, playing 1 match on 18 April 1925 against Ireland.

See also
 List of Wales international footballers (alphabetical)

References

1899 births
Welsh footballers
Wales international footballers
Place of birth missing
Year of death missing
Association footballers not categorized by position